Brian Clark (born 3 September 1964) was a Zimbabwean cricketer. He was a right-handed batsman and a leg-break bowler who played for Matabeleland. He was born in Bulawayo.

Clark made three appearances in the Logan Cup competition of 1993-94, scoring a half century in his debut innings. His second first-class match was slightly more successful still, as he scored a career-best 56 runs in an innings victory, in which he partnered four-time Test cricketer Wayne James to James' highest first-class score of 215 runs.

Clarke was an upper-middle order batsman and an occasional bowler, though he failed to secure a single wicket in 18 overs of bowling.

External links
Brian Clark at Cricket Archive 

1964 births
Living people
Zimbabwean cricketers
Matabeleland cricketers